Blackbird, blackbirds, black bird or black birds may refer to:

Birds
Two groups of birds in the parvorder Passerida:
 New World blackbirds, family Icteridae
 Old World blackbirds, any of several species belonging to the genus Turdus in the family Turdidae
Chinese blackbird
Common blackbird
Grey-winged blackbird
Indian blackbird
Somali thrush or Somali blackbird
Tibetan blackbird
White-collared blackbird

Arts, entertainment, and media

Books
 Black Bird (Basilières novel), 2003, by Michel Basilières
 Blackbird (Dibia novel), 2011
 Blackbirds (Wendig novel), 2012, by Chuck Wendig
 Blackbird (memoir), 2000, by Jennifer Lauck
 Blackbird, a 1986 novel by Larry Duplechan
 Blackbird (journal), an online journal of literature and the arts
 Black Bird (manga), 2007, by Kanoko Sakurakoji
 Blackbird (comics), an aircraft in the X-Men comics
 Blackbird (Femizon), a villain in the Marvel Comics universe
 Blackbird (Image Comics), see Sam Humphries

Film, theatre and TV

Film and television
 Black Bird, a 1973 South Korean film featuring Namkoong Won
 Black Birds (film), a 1967 Yugoslav film
 Blackbird (2007 film), directed by Adam Rapp
 Blackbird (2012 film), directed by Jason Buxton
 Blackbird (2013 film), a 2013 drama film
 Blackbird (2014 film), directed by Patrik-Ian Polk
 Blackbird (2018 film), a spy film directed by, written by and starring Michael Flatley
 Blackbird (2019 film), a drama film directed by Roger Michell
 Blackbirds (1915 film), a silent film starring Laura Hope Crews
 Blackbirds (1920 film), a lost silent film starring Justine Johnstone
 The Black Bird, a 1975 film starring George Segal
 The Blackbird, a 1926 film directed by Tod Browning
 Deadfall (2012 film), directed by Stefan Ruzowitzky, which had the working title Blackbird
 Beyond the Lights, a 2014 film directed by Gina Prince-Bythewood originally titled Blackbird
 Black Bird (miniseries), a 2022 Apple TV+ miniseries

Theatre
 Blackbird (play), 2005, by David Harrower
 Blackbird, a play by Adam Rapp
 Blackbirds of 1928, a Broadway revue, based on the 1926 London revue Blackbirds
 Blackbirds of 1933, a follow-up to Blackbirds of 1928

Music

Instruments
 Blackbird (violin), a playable full size violin made of igneous rock
 Epiphone Blackbird, an electric bass guitar

Groups 
 Blackbird (band), an American post-punk band
 The Blackbirds (German band), 1960s
 The Blackbirds (Norwegian band)
The Blackbirds (South African band)
The Blackbyrds, an American rhythm and blues and jazz-funk fusion group

Albums 
 Black Byrd, a 1973 album by Donald Byrd
 Blackbird (Alter Bridge album), 2007
 Blackbird (Fat Freddy's Drop album), 2013, or the title song
 Blackbird (Dan Sultan album), 2014
 Musta Lindu, re-released as Black Bird, by Värttinä

Songs and compositions  
 "Blackbird" (Beatles song), 1968
 "Blackbird" (Alter Bridge song), 2007
 "Blackbird" (Norma John song), 2017
 Le Merle noir ("The Blackbird"), a chamber work by Olivier Messiaen
 "Blackbird", a song by Alkaline Trio from Is This Thing Cursed?
 "Black Bird", a song by the Beautiful Girls
 "Blackbird", a song by Benny Benassi from ...Phobia
 "Blackbird", a song by Dido from Girl Who Got Away
 "Blackbirds", a song by Erin McKeown from Distillation
 "Blackbird", a song by Graves
 "Blackbird", a song by Madness from Can't Touch Us Now
 "Blackbird", a song by Marcy Playground from Leaving Wonderland...in a fit of rage
 "Blackbird", an instrumental by Mike Oldfield from Light + Shade
 "Blackbird", a song by Silly Wizard from Live Wizardry
 "Blackbird", a song by Nina Simone from Nina Simone with Strings
 "Blackbird", a song by Tash Sultana from Flow State
 "Blackbird", a song by Third Day from Third Day
 "Blackbirds", a song by Linkin Park from the video game 8-Bit Rebellion!
 "The Blackbird", a song by The Wurzels
 "Bye Bye Blackbird", a 1926 jazz standard by Ray Henderson and Mort Dixon often known simply as "Blackbird"

Other
 Blackbird, a car in the anime Wangan Midnight and the video game, Wangan Midnight Maximum Tune
 Task Force Blackbird, a CIA organization in the video game Medal of Honor: Warfighter

People
 Blackbird (Omaha leader) (c. 1750–1800)
 Andrew Blackbird (c. 1815–1908), Odawa leader and historian
 Lewis Blackbird (born 1987), British motorcycle speedway rider
 King Parsons (born 1949), American wrestler who used the ring name "The Blackbird"
 Ziryab (789–857), Kurdish musician and performer, whose name means "blackbird" or "nightingale"

Places
 Blackbird, Delaware
 Blackbird Hundred, an unincorporated subdivision of New Castle County, Delaware, U.S.
 Blackbird Leys, a civil parish in Oxford, England
 Blackbird mine, a defunct cobalt mine in Lemhi County, Idaho, U.S.
 Blackbird Township, Thurston County, Nebraska
 Blackbird Vineyards, a California winery

Science and technology

Computing
 Blackbird (online platform), a cancelled Microsoft MSN development platform
 Blackbird (software), video software.
 Blackbird, an internal codename for Apple Computer's Macintosh IIfx desktop computer
 Blackbird, the internal codename for Apple Computer's PowerBook 500 series of laptops
 HP Blackbird 002, a personal computer

Vehicles

Air
 Lockheed SR-71 Blackbird, a United States Air Force supersonic reconnaissance aircraft
 A-12 Blackbird, the unofficial nickname for the forerunner to the SR-71 Blackbird, codenamed A-12 OXCART
 Aero A.34 Kos (English: Blackbird), a 1930s Czechoslovakian biplane
 Mutual Blackbird, a late 1920s biplane

Land and rail
 Blackbird (wind-powered vehicle), a wheeled vehicle that demonstrated its ability to go downwind faster than the wind
 Blackbird, a GWR 3300 Class steam locomotive on the Great Western Railway in England
 Super Blackbird, a model name given to the Honda CBR1100XX sport-touring motorcycle
 "The Blackbird", a dragster driven by professional racer Jack Beckman

Sport
 Baltimore Blackbirds, a defunct indoor American football team
 FC Jyväskylä Blackbird, a Finnish football club
 LIU Brooklyn Blackbirds, sports teams of Long Island University's Brooklyn campus

See also
 Blackbeard (c. 1680–1718), English pirate
 Blackbirding, a recruitment practice utilizing trickery or kidnapping
 Bluebird (disambiguation)
 Redbird (disambiguation)